María Hernández may refer to:

 María Hernández (swimmer) (born 2001), Nicaraguan swimmer
 María Hernández (golfer) (born 1986), Spanish golfer
 María Antonieta Hernández (born 1958), Mexican gymnast
 Maria L. de Hernández (1896–1986), Mexican-American rights activist
 María Julia Hernández (1939–2007), Salvadoran human rights advocate
 María Talavera Hernández (born 1964), Mexican politician

See also	
 Maria Hernandez Park, a municipal park in Brooklyn, New York City